This is the list of fraternities and sororities based in Estonia. The list is incomplete.

Umbrella organization: Federation of Estonian Student Unions.

Corporations 
Amicitia
Arminia Dorpatensis
Ave
Filiae Patriae
Fraternitas Anarhensis
Fraternitas Arctica
Fraternitas Estica
Fraternitas Liviensis
Fraternitas Tartuensis
Fraternitas Ucuensis (during the time of Baltic University and later as an émigré organization in USA)
Fraternitas Viliensis
Hasmonea (former)
Indla
Korporatsioon Kungla
Lembela
Korp! Leola
Neobaltia
Revelia
Rotalia|Rotalia
Kaljola
Vicinia
Korporatsioon Sakala
Sororitas Estoniae
Syringa
Tehnola
Ugala
Vironia
Wäinla

Societies 
Societies
Estonian Students' Society
ÜS Liivika
EÜS Põhjala
EÜS Ühendus
Eesti Naisüliõpilaste Selts
Ühendus
ÜS Raimla
ÜÜ Fraternitas Fennica
Taurus
EYS Veljesto
Setumaa Eesti Üliõpilaste Selts

References 

 
Lists of student societies
Lists of organizations based in Estonia
Estonia education-related lists